Sri Charitropakhyan or Pakhyan Charitar and also Tria Charitra (also known as ਸ਼੍ਰੀ ਚਰਿਤ੍ਰੋਪਾਖ੍ਯਾਨ and ਤ੍ਰਿਯਾ ਚਰਿਤ੍ਰ) is a huge composition, with the purpose of learning from others' mistakes to acquire more refined judgement in all fields, present in Dasam Granth, which is generally and traditionally ascribed to Guru Gobind Singh. The composition contains 404 tales of wiles of men and women, containing many historical, mythological and philosophical aspects, having 7558 verses. This composition ends at Chopai which is one of the Nitnem banis. The term Charitropakhyan is derived from two words, Charitar means characteristics/function of character and Pakhyan means already told. There are two types of Charitars, Purakh Charitar (male characters) and Tria Chariter (female characters).

There is dispute over the authorship of Charitropakhyan among scholars, with some claiming that it is out of tune with other Sikh scriptures, and thus must have been composed by other poets.

Plot
In a literal sense, Charitropakhyan is a plot created by the author in which there is an account of stories told by the wise minister to his King (ਮੰਤ੍ਰੀ ਭੂਪ ਸੰਬਾਦੇ). The plot is explained in the second tale, which is as follows:

King Chitra Singh of Chitravati married a damsel of Indra's kingdom. She gave birth to a son, Hanuvant Singh. The damsel deserted the king when he grew old. He ordered all of his employees to find her, but instead found another similar looking girl named Chitramati. Chitramati was the daughter of the ruler of Orissa. To marry her, he had a fight with her father, the ruler of Orissa. Chitramati was about the age of the son of Chitra Singh, Hanuvant Singh. She grew heavily attracted to him and tried to seduce him into a sexual relationship, but Hanuvant Singh was religious in thought and did not go for incest. She in turn created a drama and accused Hanuvant Singh of raping her. King Chitra Singh believed her blindly, without knowing the side of his son, and sentenced him to death.

Mantri, the wise adviser of the King, knew that the King's second wife, Chitramati, was not of a pious character and was falsely blaming Hanuvant Singh. In order to prevent the wrongful execution of Hanuvant Singh, the adviser shared various accounts of stories depicting different situations, with the intention of making the King realize his folly and improve his decision-making skill.

List of tales
Following is the list of tales present in Dasam Granth:

Summary of tales
The following are the summaries of several tales, translated from the work of Dr Rattan Singh Jaggi steek of Dasam Granth

98. Tale Of Heer Ranjha 

Ranjha was an avatar of Indra and Heer was avatar of Apsara Meneka who was given abhi-shaap (curse) by Rishi Kapil to get born on Matlok. Rishi kapil was visiting inderlok when he got opportunity to saw Menaka for first time in king Inder darbar and his "Biraj" fell on seeing her. This led to rishi kapil cursing Menaka in anger! " you will take birth in Matlok. Ranjha was born near river chenab at house of chitar devi. As years went by a great famine came and only those people survived who were rich. Ranjha mother during famine in order to survive, sold him to a Jat family and he became an attractive young man whosoever girl saw him, fell for him saying "Ranjha Ranjha" the famous couplet popular in today times. Similarly Heer ended up being born into Choochak Clan. As the epic moves forward they fell in love and heer was married to Khera family as her father doesn't agree with Ranjha. Now Ranjha becomes a beggar and joins the Doli (Marriage) party of heer during her marriage. When ranjha gets a chance with heer alone they both suicide together and leave for Swarga back into their positions of Indra and Meneka. The authors today sing this Plot(Charitar).

Bhai Gurdas also references this epic in Vaar 27 Pauri 1

ਰਾਂਝਾ ਹੀਰ ਵਖਾਣੀਐ ਓਹੁ ਪਿਰਮ ਪਰਾਤੀ॥
Ranjha and Heer are renowned for the love they bore each other.

ਪੀਰ ਮੁਰੀਦਾ ਪਿਰਹੜੀ ਗਾਵਨਿ ਪਰਭਾਤੀ॥੧॥
But superior to all is the love, the disciples bear for their Guru. They sing it at the ambrosial hour of morning

100. Tale of Clever Woman 

In Raghu-kul a king named Roopeswar was a famous and respected in Nagar of Ropar (now Punjab). He had a queen named "Chittar Kumari" and she was very beautiful and no other woman was equally beautiful to her. A Danav (demon) came over from Lanka to Ropar. He was enticed by the Rani and Danav mind got fixed on her. The king called his bishops for consulting to get rid of Danav. And they sent a powerful Muslim general (Mullah) to fight him off and Mullah challenged Danav with his power. Danav responded by lifting the castle around him in one hand and Mullah in other and he placed castle on his head as if he is the pillar supporting him and the castle fell on him and this is how he sent the mullah to Jampur (City of Death). Then, the king sent his second Muslim general, who Danav lifted from legs and banged him on earth and killed him. Then came another one who he picked and threw in the river.
Then came a woman in front of Danav, and she started praising the dana and this pacified the Danav. She enticed the Danav. She fed the Danav with various kind of food and wines, which made Danav happy. She started doing this every day for him and he started trusting her more and more.
One day she sat sad in front of her and Danav asked her, you take good care of me and you ask nothing for return. Tell me what you want, why are you sad and I will fulfill your wish.  He asked 2 or 3 times and she responded by saying. I am bothered by an Asur (demon) and I don't think you can do anything about it.
Hearing this the Danav wrote a Jantar for her and told her take this and whosoever sees it once will be burned to ashes. She smartly took it from him and opened it and showed him immediately. Danav saw it himself and burned himself to ashes.

Lesson: Thus, the Danav who could not have been even won over by the powerful "kings of kings" Indra, ended up being deceived (Charitar) by a simple woman.

101. Tale Of Soni Mahiwal 

On the bank of the river Ravi, there use to live a Jat named Mahiwal. Seeing him Sohni fell in love with him. When sun use to go down, she use to come visit her by crossing the river Ravi. She use to swim across the river by holding “Baked Clay Pot” or Pakka Ghadda which does not dissolves in water. One day when she started her journey, her brother woke up and started following her. The secret of her journey to meet Mahiwal was now known to her brother, but Sohni did not know her secret is revealed to her brother. Next day in morning her brother went and replaced the Pakka ghadda with Kacha Ghadda or “unbaked clay pot” which dissolves in water. Thus that night Sohni picked her kachaa ghadda and began journey. She swam half way and the Unbaked clay pot melted in waters of Ravi and sohni sank and died in water. Mahiwal waiting and waiting started searching for Sohni in Ravi waters. A strong wave current came and he also sank in the river and died.

Learning: Thus, One Person (her own Brother) constructed a plot (Charitar) which ended up killing sohni and mahiwal.

Bhai Gurdas also references this epic in Vaar 27 Pauri 1

ਮੇਹੀਵਾਲ ਨੋ ਸੋਹਣੀ ਨੈ ਤਰਦੀ ਰਾਤੀ।
The fame of Sohni who used to swim the Chenab river in the night to meet Mahival is well known.

ਪੀਰ ਮੁਰੀਦਾ ਪਿਰਹੜੀ ਗਾਵਨਿ ਪਰਭਾਤੀ॥੧॥
But superior to all is the love, the disciples bear for their Guru. They sing it at the ambrosial hour of morning

108. Tale of Sassi Punnu 

The Rishi Kapil came over to some place and  saw an Apsara named Rambha. Seeing Rambha his mind got affixed with her and his "Biraj" fell on earth. From his Biraj, Rambha got pregnant, which resulted  in a girl child being born. Rambha threw that child in Sind River and went to swarga.

The girl kept floating in river Sind and Was rescued by Kind of Sind Brahamdatt. He started taking care of her as a daughter and named her Sassi or "Sassiya" as she was more beautiful than the Moon (Sass).

When she grew up, she was married to King Punnu. The King Punnu already had Rani before Sassi. As Punnu grew fond of Sassi, the other Elder Rani got jealous of Sassi. She plotted to kill Punnu with her servants, when King Punnu will go for hunting next time. The day of death came and King Punnu went for Hunting and the servant of Elder Rani fired his arrow and took the King down in middle of Dark jungle. The news of death came to Sassi and she went with her servants to middle of jungle to see dead body of Punnu, and seeing the body Sassi also died.

The story ends with Dharamraj Response

In Dharamraj Sabha news of death came of Sassi and Punnu, Dharamraj responded that with the jealous fervor sorrow, the Other Rani got angry and did Charitar(Plotted) to kill her Husband Punnu, with the same Sorrow she will taken, lets do this solution.

Learning: Jealousy always leads to wrong ending and is punishable in court of Dharamraj.

Dharamraj can be referenced in Guru Granth Sahib Jee, Ang 967 Line 6 Raag Raamkali: Bhatt Satta & Balwand
ਧਰਮ ਰਾਇ ਹੈ ਦੇਵਤਾ ਲੈ ਗਲਾ ਕਰੇ ਦਲਾਲੀ॥

The Righteous Judge of Dharma(DharamRaj) considered the arguments and makes the decision.

Bhai Gurdas Vaar also references this epic in Vaar 27 Pauri 1

ਸਸੀ ਪੁੰਨੂੰ ਦੋਸਤੀ ਹੁਇ ਜਾਤਿ ਅਜਾਤੀ।
The love of Sassi and Punnü, though of different castes, is everywhere spoken of.

ਪੀਰ ਮੁਰੀਦਾ ਪਿਰਹੜੀ ਗਾਵਨਿ ਪਰਭਾਤੀ॥੧॥
But superior to all is the love, the disciples bear for their Guru. They sing it at the ambrosial hour of morning

Authorship
The different theories on the authorship of the Pakhyan Charitar:
 The historical and traditional view is that the entire work was composed by Guru Gobind Singh himself.
 The entire collection was composed by the poets of the Guru's entourage.
 Only a part of the work was composed by the Guru, while the rest was composed by the other poets.
 The work is not related to the Guru, but was instead written by an unknown poet.

Historical references
The following are historical references from the 18th Century, which claim that Guru Gobind Singh had written tales at Anandpur as well as at Dina Kangar:

Letter to Mata Sundri, Bhai Mani Singh

The letter is claimed to have been written by Bhai Mani Singh to Mata Sundari in 1716, after 8 years of the demise of Guru Gobind Singh. This manuscript provides evidence of existence of 303 Charitars, Shastar Nam Mala and Krishna Avtar compositions. This manuscript was written before compilation of dasam granth during collections of various compositions. Among critics Gyani Harnam Singh Balabh believes that only 303 Charitars were written by Guru Gobind Singh among 404 Charitars in Charitropakhyan. According to Robin Rinehart in Debating the Dasam Granth (2011), the letter first appeared publicly in the late 1920's and its style of writing and handwriting was analyzed by Rattan Singh Jaggi in the 1960's who concluded that it does not match with Bhai Mani Singh's time period, casting doubts on its authenticity.

Parchi Gobind Singh - Bava Sevadas
This manuscript was finished sometime in the first quarter of the eighteenth century (around 1741) by Seva Das, an Udasi. He mentioned that Guru Gobind Singh had written tales in Persian in Zafarnama, called Hikaaitaan during his lifetime. Many of these tales are the Persian translations of the narratives in Charitropakhyan.

Mahima Parkash, Sarup Das Bhalla
This book was completed by Sarup Das, who belong to lineage of Guru Amar Dass, in 1776. He had access to whole Dasam Granth and mentioned that 404 Charitars and Chaubis Avtar was written by Guru Gobind Singh. He states:
ਦੋਹਰਾ॥  
ਬੇਦ ਬਿਦਿਆ ਪ੍ਰਕਾਸ਼ ਕੋ ਸੰਕਲਪ ਧਰਿਓ ਮਨ ਦਿਆਲ ॥ 
ਪੰਡਤ ਪੁਰਾਨ ਇੱਕਤ੍ਰ ਕਰ ਭਾਖਾ ਰਚੀ ਬਿਸਾਲ ॥ 

ਚੋਪਈ॥ 
ਆਗਿਆ ਕੀਨੀ ਸਤਗੁਰ ਦਿਆਲਾ ॥ 
ਬਿਦਿਆਵਾਨ ਪੰਡਤ ਲੇਹੁ ਭਾਲ ॥ 
ਜੋ ਜਿਸ ਬਿਦਾਆ ਗਿਆਤਾ ਹੋਇ ॥ 
ਵਹੀ ਪੁਰਾਨ ਸੰਗ ਲਿਆਵੇ ਸੋਇ ॥ 
ਦੇਸ ਦੇਸ ਕੋ ਸਿਖ ਚਲਾਏ ॥ 
ਪੰਡਤ ਪੁਰਾਨ ਸੰਗਤਿ ਲਿਆਏ ॥ 
ਬਾਨਾਰਸ ਆਦ ਜੋ ਬਿਦਿਆ ਠੌਰਾ ॥ 

ਪੰਡਤ ਸਭ ਬਿਦਿਆ ਸਿਰਮੌਰਾ ॥ 
ਸਤਿਗੁਰ ਕੇ ਆਇ ਇਕਤ੍ਰ ਸਭ ਭਏ ॥ 
ਬਹੁ ਆਦਰ ਸਤਗੁਰ ਜੀ ਦਏ ॥ 
ਮਿਰਜਾਦਾਬਾਧ ਖਰਚ ਕੋ ਦਇਆ ॥ 
ਖੇਦ ਬਿਭੇਦ ਕਾਹੂ ਨਹੀਂ ਭਇਆ ॥ 
ਗੁਰਮੁਖੀ ਲਿਖਾਰੀ ਨਿਕਟ ਬੁਲਾਏ ॥ 
ਤਾ ਕੋ ਸਭ ਬਿਧ ਦਈ ਬਣਾਏ ॥ 
ਕਰ ਭਾਖਾ ਲਿਖੋ ਗੁਰਮੁਖੀ ਭਾਇ ॥ 
ਮੁਨਿਮੋ ਕੋ ਦੇਹੁ ਕਥਾ ਸੁਨਾਇ ॥ 

ਦੋਹਰਾ ॥
ਨਨੂਆ ਬੈਰਾਗੀ ਸ਼ਿਆਮ ਕਬ ਬ੍ਰਹਮ ਭਾਟ ਜੋ ਆਹਾ ॥
ਭਈ ਨਿਹਚਲ ਫਕੀਰ ਗੁਰ ਬਡੇ ਗੁਨਗ ਗੁਨ ਤਾਹਾ॥ 
ਅਵਰ ਕੇਤਕ ਤਿਨ ਨਾਮ ਨ ਜਾਨੋ ॥ 
ਲਿਖੇ ਸਗਲ ਪੁਨਿ ਕਰੇ ਬਿਖਾਨੋ ॥ 
ਚਾਰ ਬੇਦ ਦਸ ਅਸ਼ਟ ਪੁਰਾਨਾ ॥ 
ਛੈ ਸਾਸਤ੍ਰ ਸਿਮ੍ਰਤ ਆਨਾ ॥ 

ਚੋਪਈ॥
ਚੋਬਿਸ ਅਵਤਾਰ ਕੀ ਭਾਖਾ ਕੀਨਾ॥ 
ਚਾਰ ਸੋ ਚਾਰ ਚਲਿਤ੍ਰ ਨਵੀਨਾ॥
ਭਾਖਾ ਬਣਾਈ ਪ੍ਰਭ ਸ੍ਰਵਣ  ਕਰਾਈ॥
ਭਏ ਪ੍ਰਸੰਨ ਸਤਗੁਰ ਮਨ ਭਾਈ॥ 
ਸਭ ਸਹੰਸਕ੍ਰਿਤ ਭਾਖਾ ਕਰੀ ॥ 
ਬਿਦਿਆ ਸਾਗਰ ਗ੍ਰਿੰਥ ਪਰ ਚੜੀ ॥

Relationship with Hikaaitaan
The following is a list of Hikayats, which are similar to narratives in Charitropakhyan, rewritten in the Persian Language. In fact, many of these are the Persian translations of the narratives in Charitropakhyan.
 Hikayat 4 is Persian adaptation of Charitra 52
 Hikayat 5 is Persian adaptation of Charitra 267
 Hikayat 8 is Persian adaptation of Charitra 118
 Hikayat 9 is Persian adaptation of Charitra 290
 Hikayat 11 is Persian adaptation of Charitra 246

The similarity of narratives in Hikayats and Charitropakhyan serves directs the single Authorship of both compositions.

See also 

 Charitar 2
 Charitar 71
 Charitar 266
 Charitar 373

References

 
Dasam Granth
1696 books
Lists of stories
Frame stories